The 2017 All England Super Series Premier was the first Super Series tournament of the 2017 BWF Super Series. The tournament took place in Birmingham, England, from 7 to 12 March 2017 and had a total purse of $600,000.

Men's singles

Seeds

Top half

Bottom half

Finals

Women's singles

Seeds

Top half

Bottom half

Finals

Men's doubles

Seeds

Top half

Bottom half

Finals

Women's doubles

Seeds

Top half

Bottom half

Finals

Mixed doubles

Seeds

Top half

Bottom half

Finals

References

External links
Tournament Link
Official website

All England Open Badminton Championships
2017 BWF Super Series
All England
International sports competitions in Birmingham, West Midlands
March 2017 sports events in the United Kingdom